Margarita Robles was a Spanish screenwriter and actress active from the 1940s through the 1970s. She was married to Spanish film director Gonzalo Delgrás, with whom she frequently collaborated.

Selected filmography 
As screenwriter:

 El hombre que veía la muerte (1955)
 Under the Skies of the Asturias (1951)
 Un viaje de novios (1948)
 Trece onzas de oro (1947)
 El misterioso viajero del Clipper (1945)
 Ni tuyo ni mío (1944)
 Altar mayor (1944)
 La boda de Quinita Flores (1943) 
 Cristina Guzmán (1943)
 La condesa María (1942)
 Un marido a precio fijo (1942)

As actress:

 The House Without Frontiers (1972)
 Run, Psycho, Run (1968)
 Piso de soltero (1964)
 El Cristo de los Faroles (1958)
 El genio alegre (1957)
 Miracle of the White Suit (1956)
 La lupa (1955)
 La hermana alegría (1955)
 The Song of Sister Maria (1952)
 Cerca de la ciudad (1952)
 El misterioso viajero del Clipper (1945)
 Altar mayor (1944)
 La condesa María (1942)
 La doncella de la duquesa (1941)
 Los millones de Polichinela (1941)

References

External links

Spanish film actresses
1894 births
1989 deaths
Spanish women screenwriters
20th-century Spanish screenwriters